The Dream Chapter: Magic is the debut studio album by South Korean boy band TXT. It was released on October 21, 2019 by Big Hit Entertainment and Republic Records. It serves as a follow-up to the band's debut extended play The Dream Chapter: Star (2019). The album contains eight songs, including the lead single, "9 and Three Quarters (Run Away)". Musically, the album incorporates different genres including R&B, tropical house, acoustic pop and hip hop.

Commercially, the album debuted atop South Korea's Gaon Album Chart, becoming TXT's second chart-topping release of the year. It also charted on the US Billboard World Albums chart at number three. To promote the album, TXT appeared on several South Korean music programs.

Background and release

The Dream Chapter: Magic is the band's first studio album. It follows their debut EP The Dream Chapter: Star released in March, 2019. On October 1, a teaser video was dropped on YouTube, announcing that the band will release their first full-length album on October 21. The first official concept trailer for the album was released on October 3. The trailer combines two-dimensional graphics using the group's dynamic performance and projection mapping to stir a mysterious atmosphere. Following the release of the concept trailer, two sets of concept photos-"Sanctuary" and "Arcadia" versions were released. The Sanctuary version of the concept photos was released on October 7, alongside a mood board showing the boys in school. The Arcadia version, released a day later portrayed a darker theme. Both the concept photo versions express the boys' dream of deviance. On October 11, the tracklist of the full album was released, along-with the album cover. On October 17, a second teaser video for the album was released on the group's official website revealing the lead single "9 and Three Quarters (Run Away)" and demonstrating some of the energetic performances of the members. On October 18, the band released a preview video of the album on their official website. On October 21, The Dream Chapter: Magic was released physically and digitally alongside a music video for the album's lead single "9 and Three Quarters (Run Away)".

Individual teasers for the members (Soobin, Yeonjun, Beomgyu, Taehyun, Huening Kai) were released for the music video of the acoustic pop track "Magic Island" from November 13 to November 16. The official music video for "Magic Island" was released on November 17. Individual teasers for each of the members were released for the music video of the track "Angel or Devil". The official music video was released on November 28.

Composition
Musically, the album spans a variety of different music genres, including R&B, tropical house, acoustic pop and hip hop. The album opens with "a breathy, groovy jam" of "New Rules" that shifts "into its shout-along, anthemic chorus and turning into the trap-inflected hook". The album's lead single, "9 and Three Quarters (Run Away)" is a synth-pop track with new wave vibes, featuring a satisfying rock-pop chorus. The song is about finding strength in sacred moments shared among friends, alluding to Platform 9¾. "Can't We Just Leave the Monster Alive?" and "Magic Island" are electropop songs while "Roller Coaster" is a house-pop. "Popping Star" is a bubblegum pop. "Angel or Devil" is an exuberant bouncy hip hop track while "20cm" is an "R&B ballad".

Music videos
A music video for the electro-rock single "9 and Three Quarters (Run Away)" was released on October 21. The video portrays them as high schoolers who are transported to a new world where they are allowed to embrace their magic and be themselves. The music video was directed and produced by OUI.

A music video for "Magic Island" was released on November 17. The video features references to the past videos of "Nap of a Star" and "9 and Three Quarters (Run Away)". The 14-minute long video is more along the lines of a short mini film where the five members of the group are seen as students having adventures together and getting mysteriously transported to a fantasy land. The music video was directed and produced by Digipedi.

A subsequent music video for "Angel or Devil" was released on November 28. The video explores the dichotomy of the song’s lyrics and title and emphasizes the high-energy choreography of the members while debating being "Angel or Devil.”

Promotion
According to a press release, The Dream Chapter: Magic will showcase “the second story of the boys chasing their dreams.”

Pre-release
On October 3, the group dropped a concept trailer video. Featuring the group's colorful aesthetics, the members were seen to perform "gravity-defying" choreography. The members were seen playing shapes and perspectives, projections, and 3D graphics against the backdrop of a blank canvas. On October 17, the official teaser of the album's lead single "9 and Three Quarters (Run Away)" was released. The video begins with Taehyun standing in the middle of the hallway where many students come and go. Close-ups of the members staring at the camera with deep eyes appear in the middle of the video, creating a mysterious atmosphere. The members are also seen to perform dynamic choreography.

Live performances
On October 21, TXT began promoting lead single "9 and Three Quarters (Run Away)", "New Rules" and "Angel or Devil" on South Korean music shows. On the same day, they held a live showcase at the concert hall of Yonsei University in Seodaemun-gu, Seoul. On October 29, "9 and Three Quarters (Run Away)" won first place at SBS MTV's The Show.

Critical reception

Billboard described the album as a "complex, varied soundscape inspired by the titular theme, with elements of groove, punk-pop, R&B, house, and a whole wide range of other genres littered throughout as the five -- Soobin, Yeonjun, Beomgyu, Taehyun, and Huening Kai -- share more sides to themselves as one of this year's most sonically exciting rookie acts." Writing for MTV, Crystal Bell commended the "eclectic mix of genres" of the album, that "diversifies the group's sound without completely losing their signature energy and stylistic flourishes". The lead single "9 and Three Quarters (Run Away)" was ranked No. 2 on Dazeds list of the 20 best K-pop songs of 2019, with the magazine describing the song as "seamlessly woven and infused with a magnetic urgency" that has "the undercurrents – chunky, compressed drums and tight guitar riffs" which "are amplified to stadium rock levels, chasing the melody into a gloriously hooky, firework of a chorus where TXT’s vocals burst forth with a luminous mix of desperation and rebellion". Billboard included the song in its list of "The 25 Best K-pop Songs of 2019: Critics' Picks". "Magic Island" was included in MTV's list of "The Best K-pop B-sides of 2019".

Commercial performance
The Dream Chapter: Magic debuted at No. 1 on Gaon Album Chart, surpassing 124,000 sales in its first week. This marked the group's second chart-topping album following The Dream Chapter: Star. The album debuted at No. 3 on Billboards World Albums Chart. The album also opened at No. 6 on the Heatseeker's Album Chart. A total of four tracks from the album entered the Billboard World Digital Songs chart with the lead single "9 and Three Quarters (Run Away)" debuting at No. 2. Additionally, "New Rules" opened at No. 16, "20cm" at No. 18 and "Angel or Devil" at No. 21.

Track listing
The credits are adapted from the official album profile on Naver.

Notes
 Gu-wa sa-bun-ui sam seunggangjang-eseo neoreul gidaryeo  "Waiting for you at Platform 9 3/4"
 Ganjireowo  "Itchy"
 Geunyang goemur-eul sallyeodumyeon an doeneun geolkka?

Personnel
Credits adapted from AllMusic and Tidal.

 Adora – digital editing, recording engineer, vocal arrangement, background vocals
 Lauren Aquilina – background vocals
 Jacob Attwooll- recording  engineer, background vocals
 "Hitman" Bang – production
 TXT – primary vocals
 Caesar & Loui – recording engineer, background vocals
 El Capitxn – production, digital editing, recording engineer, keyboard, synthesizer, vocal arrangement
 Jon Castelli - mix engineer
 Hector Castillo - mix engineer, studio personnel
 Melanie Joy Fontana – background vocals
 Ingmar Carlsen – mixing assistance, studio personnel
 DJ Riggins – recording assistance, studio personnel
 Yang Ga - mix engineer, studio personnel
 Ghstloop – digital editing
 Jayrah Gibson – background vocals
 John Haynes - mix engineer, studio personnel
 Hi-Bye – background vocals
 Hiss Noise – digital editing, synthesizer, vocal arrangement
 Shae Jacobs – production, recording engineer, programming, background vocals, instruments
 Jaycen Joshua – mix engineer, studio personnel
 Nicole Kim – A&R

 Sam Klempner – production, bass, drums, recording engineer, keyboard, mix engineer, programming, synthesizer, background vocals, studio personnel
 Jordan Kyle – production, drums, recording engineer, guitar, keyboard, synthesizer
 Gia Lim – A&R
 Randy Merill – mastering engineer, studio personnel
 Pdogg – production, keyboard, synthesizer
 Revine - digital editing
 Jacob Richards - recording assistance, studio personnel
 Mike Seaberg - recording assistance, studio personnel
 Michel Lindgren Schulz – recording engineer
 Slow Rabbit – production, digital editing, recording engineer, keyboard, programming, synthesizer, vocal arrangement
 Soulman – background vocals
 Supreme Boi – production, digital editing, keyboard, synthesizer,  vocal arrangement
 Peter Thomas – production, drums programming, recording engineer, guitar, piano, background vocals, whistle
 Jake Torrey – engineering, background vocals
 Wonderkid- production, digital editing, keyboard, synthesizer, vocal arrangement
 Shinkung- production
 X-Limit – background vocals
 Hiju Yang – A&R
 Jordan “DJ Swivel” Young – recording engineer, background vocals
 Tiffany Young – guitar

Charts

Weekly charts

Year-end charts

Accolades

Certifications and sales

Release history

See also 
 List of Gaon Album Chart number ones of 2019
 List of K-pop songs on the Billboard charts
 List of K-pop albums on the Billboard charts

Notes

References

2019 debut albums
Korean-language albums
Tomorrow X Together albums
Hybe Corporation albums